Léon Buck (16 October 1915 – 20 May 1972) was a Luxembourgian épée and foil fencer. He competed at the 1948 and 1952 Summer Olympics.

References

External links
 

1915 births
1972 deaths
Luxembourgian male épée fencers
Luxembourgian male foil fencers
Olympic fencers of Luxembourg
Fencers at the 1948 Summer Olympics
Fencers at the 1952 Summer Olympics
Sportspeople from Luxembourg City